Steve Kestell (June 15, 1955) is a Wisconsin politician, legislator, and business owner.

Kestell was born in Lyndon, Wisconsin Kestell graduated from Plymouth High School

Political career

In 1998, Kestell was elected to the Wisconsin State Assembly and has been in the assembly since 1999.

Kestell voted against the state budget in 2013, citing too many non-fiscal policy items contained within the budget. It was Kestell's contention that policy changes should pass through the regular legislative process.

Personal life

Kestell is married and has three children.

References

 

People from Lyndon, Sheboygan County, Wisconsin
Republican Party members of the Wisconsin State Assembly
1955 births
Living people
21st-century American politicians
People from Elkhart Lake, Wisconsin